Gifford is a masculine given name. Notable people with the name include:

 Gifford Beal, 1879 – 1956, American artist
 Gifford Dalley, 18th century American civil servant
 Gifford Fox, 1903 – 1959, British politician
 Gifford Miller, born 1969, American politician
 Gifford Nielsen, born 1954, American football player
 Gifford Pinchot, 1865 – 1946, American forester and politician

See also
 William Gifford Palgrave

Masculine given names